Michael Shenstone (June 25, 1928 – September 9, 2019) was a Canadian diplomat.

He served in a variety of senior diplomatic posts, including as Canada′s ambassador to Saudi Arabia; Canada′s ambassador to Austria; Canada′s representative to NATO - Warsaw Pact disarmament negotiations, and was the Department of Foreign Affairs director-general of African and Middle Eastern Affairs.
He also played a role in the rescue of six American diplomats who managed to evade being taken hostage during the 1979 Iranian revolution.

In 1981, when he was an assistant under-secretary of state for external affairs, the Calgary Herald called him a bruised defender of Canadian Middle East Policy, quoting him from a conference on the Middle East.

In July 1986 Shenstone′s attendance at Kurt Waldheim′s inauguration as President of Austria, stirred controversy.
An editorial in the Ottawa Citizen reminded readers that Canada followed the British model of diplomatic relations, and ″Unlike the U.S., we do not use such events to express our approval or disapproval of the person or government concerned.″

On November 15, 2012, Shenstone and American diplomat Robert Anders, compared their experiences with events of the ″Canadian caper″, with how those events were portrayed in the recent feature film Argo.

Michael Shenstone died peacefully at Sunnybrook Health Sciences Centre in Toronto on September 9, 2019.

References

1928 births
2019 deaths
Ambassadors of Canada to Saudi Arabia
Ambassadors of Canada to Austria
People from Toronto